Ljubiša is Serbian masculine given name and a surname. It may refer to:

Ljubiša Beara (1939–2017), Bosnian Serb who participated in the War in Bosnia and Herzegovina
Ljubiša Broćić (1911–1995), Serbian football manager
Ljubiša Diković (born 1960), Serbian general officer
Ljubiša Dmitrović (born 1969), Serbian football player and manager
Ljubiša Dunđerski (born 1972), former Serbian international football player
Ljubiša Jokić (born 1958), former general in the Military of Serbia and Montenegro
Visarion Ljubiša (1823–1884), the Metropolitan bishop of Orthodox church in Montenegro from 1882 to 1884
Ljubiša Milojević (born 1967), former Serbian footballer who played as a forward
Stjepan Mitrov Ljubiša (1824–1878), Montenegrin writer and politician
Ljubiša Petruševski (died 2002), Serbian oboist and the Dean of the Faculty of Music in Belgrade
Ljubiša Rajković (born 1950), Serbian defender who played for SFR Yugoslavia
Ljubiša Ranković (born 1973), former Serbian footballer
Ljubiša Samardžić (1936–2017), Serbian actor and director, who is best known as Šurda in Vruć vetar series
Ljubiša Savić (1958–2000), former Bosnian Serb paramilitary commander and post-war politician
Ljubiša Simić (born 1963), former boxer from Yugoslavia
Ljubiša Spajić (1926–2004), Serbian footballer
Ljubiša Stamenković (born 1964), Serbian football manager
Ljubiša Stanković (born 1960), Montenegrin scientist and diplomat
Ljubiša Stevanović (1910–1978), Serbian footballer
Ljubiša Stojanović (born 1952), Serbian singer from Leskovac
Ljubiša Tumbaković (born 1952), a Serbian soccer manager
Ljubiša Vukelja (born 1983), Serbian football player

Slavic masculine given names
Serbian masculine given names
Serbian surnames